Richard Wilkes  was a priest and academic in the mid sixteenth century.

Watson was educated at Queens' College, Cambridge, graduating B.A. in 1524; MA in 1527; and B.D. in 1537. He held livings at Littlebury, Pulham and Fen Ditton. He was Fellow of Queen's from 1526 to 1542; and     Master of Christ's from 1548 to 1553.

He died on 15 October 1556.

References 

Alumni of Queens' College, Cambridge
Fellows of Queens' College, Cambridge
Masters of Christ's College, Cambridge
16th-century English people
1556 deaths